Robert Henry Scarborough Jr. (March 12, 1923 – March 20, 2020) was a vice admiral in the United States Coast Guard who served as the 13th Vice Commandant from 1978 to 1982.
 
A 1944 graduate of the United States Merchant Marine Academy, Vice Admiral Scarborough entered the Coast Guard in 1949 following service as an officer in the Navy and Merchant Marine. He maintained a license as Master of ocean steam and motor vessels of unlimited tonnage. Serving in various geographical areas both ashore and afloat, his numerous earlier Coast Guard assignments were in the fields of general operations, personnel, and public information including both command afloat and command ashore as Group Commander and Captain of the Port. Previous assignments as a flag officer have been as Commander, Ninth Coast Guard District; Chief, Office of Operations; and Chief of Staff of the U.S. Coast Guard.

His military awards include the Legion of Merit with gold star, Meritorious Service Medal, Coast Guard Commendation Medal, all World War II theater medals, and the Coast Guard Distinguished Service Medal in August 1980.

He was born in Hawkinsville, Georgia. He is survived by his wife, Walterene Brant Scarborough and his two sons, Robert Henry Scarborough III and James Burton Scarborough. He died at Walter Reed National Military Medical Center in Bethesda, Maryland. on March 20, 2020 from esophageal cancer.

Dates of rank

References

United States Coast Guard admirals
Vice Commandants of the United States Coast Guard
1923 births
2020 deaths
Deaths from cancer in Maryland
Deaths from esophageal cancer
Military personnel from Georgia (U.S. state)
People from Hawkinsville, Georgia
United States Merchant Marine Academy alumni